Kapanga is a genus of South Pacific dwarf sheet spiders that was first described by Raymond Robert Forster in 1970.

Species
 it contains ten species:
Kapanga alta Forster, 1970 – New Zealand
Kapanga festiva Forster, 1970 – New Zealand
Kapanga grana Forster, 1970 – New Zealand
Kapanga hickmani (Forster, 1964) – New Zealand (Auckland Is.)
Kapanga isulata (Forster, 1970) – New Zealand
Kapanga luana Forster, 1970 – New Zealand
Kapanga mana Forster, 1970 – New Zealand
Kapanga manga Forster, 1970 – New Zealand
Kapanga solitaria (Bryant, 1935) – New Zealand
Kapanga wiltoni Forster, 1970 (type) – New Zealand

References

Araneomorphae genera
Hahniidae
Spiders of New Zealand
Taxa named by Raymond Robert Forster